Nafimidone is an anticonvulsant drug of the imidazole class. It contains a naphthyl group. It seems to have been discovered by accident during a search for antifungal agents.

Synthesis

Its synthesis is straightforward displacement of imidazole of the activated chlorine atom of chloro-methyl-β-naphthylketone.

References 

Anticonvulsants
Imidazoles
Aromatic ketones
2-Naphthyl compounds